Philip Bradley Town (born 21 September 1948) is an American investor, motivational speaker, and author of two books on financial investment that were New York Times best-sellers.

Early life and education

Phil Town was born in Portland, Oregon and graduated from Newport High School in 1966. After four attempts at college, he earned a Bachelor of Arts degree in philosophy from the University of California, San Diego.

Career 

In 1972, after serving nearly 4 years in the US Army, Phil found himself sleeping in a tent in Flagstaff, Arizona and leading whitewater rafting trips down the Colorado River to get by.

In 1980, Phil ran one of his rafting expeditions for trustees of the Outward Bound Program. The trip was nearly catastrophic when the boat almost capsized in a rough section of the Colorado River. After Phil got everything back on track and everyone was safe again, one of the men told Phil that he could be "doing better than pumping rubber all summer and living on welfare in the off-season."

In 2006, Random House released his book Rule #1: The Simple Strategy for Successful Investing in Only 15 Minutes a Week! through its Crown imprint. It quickly rose to the #1 spot on the New York Times bestseller list. Rule #1 was also on Business Week's bestseller list and appeared on USA Today's list of top business books. It is now published globally, in 14 languages.

Phil's second book, Payback Time: Making Big Money Is the Best Revenge! was released by Random House in March 2010 and immediately topped the NY Times bestseller list at #1. Payback Time explains the concept of 'Stockpiling' stocks for long term high returns with low risk.

Investment Philosophy
Phil's interest in meditation and spirituality led him to personalize what he had learned from his mentor. The investing philosophy he teaches centers around four key principles he refers to as the Four M's: Meaning, Moat, Management and Margin of Safety. In 2005, Phil began his Rule #1 blog where he would strive to teach readers how to invest without compromising their own ethics.

Media appearances

Phil has been a guest on multiple occasions on CNBC. He has been featured on The Millionaire Inside series and appears in the first and second episodes, "Your Guide to Wealth" and "Your Guide to Retiring Rich" along with David Bach and Barbara Corcoran. Phil has also been a regular contributor to MSNBC's show Your Business, and has appeared on Maria Bartiromo's show Closing Bell.

Phil also began organizing a live "3-Day Transformational Investing Workshop," where he teaches attendees how to use and apply the Rule #1 investing strategies. This workshop shows people how to invest with a low-risk, high yield Warren Buffett style approach.

Additionally, Phil and his daughter, Danielle Town started a weekly podcast, titled InvestED, in 2015. In the podcast they discuss how to enjoy managing money and investing strategy. Phil and Danielle also discuss the style of investing, and talk through the stock-picking strategies that Warren Buffett, Guy Spier, David Einhorn, Mohnish Pabrai and other great investors have used.

Phil owns a YouTube channel under the name Rule #1 Investing, and hosts a Transformational Investing Webinar with his wife, Melissa Town on a weekly basis.

References

External links
 Official Website
 Rule #1 YouTube Channel
 InvestED Podcast

American bloggers
American business theorists
American business writers
American finance and investment writers
American investors
American motivational speakers
American motivational writers
Members of the United States Army Special Forces
United States Army soldiers
University of California, San Diego alumni
1948 births
Living people
21st-century American non-fiction writers